is a private university at Moroyama, Saitama, Japan. The predecessor of the school, the Moro Hospital, was founded in 1892, and it was chartered as a university in 1972.

Alumni 
 Takashi Mitsubayashi - politician

External links
 Official website

Educational institutions established in 1892
Private universities and colleges in Japan
Medical schools in Japan
Universities and colleges in Saitama Prefecture
Moroyama, Saitama
1892 establishments in Japan